Crabb is a small unincorporated community in Fort Bend County, Texas, United States. Crabb is located along Farm to Market Road 762 and the BNSF Railroad southeast of Richmond, Texas. The Crabb road sign is located west of the intersection of Crabb River Road and Farm to Market Road 2759 and FM 762. The Zion Hill Baptist Church, a Fort Bend County Road and Bridge facility, the Brazos Village and Brazos Gardens subdivisions, several businesses and an abandoned grain elevator are in the area.

History
Old Three Hundred colonists Abner and Joseph Kuykendall were granted ownership of the land around Crabb. Joseph died sometime in the 1870s and his widow Eliza Jane married John C. Crabb. When the Gulf, Colorado and Santa Fe Railway laid track through the area in 1879, it bought the land from Eliza Jane Crabb. Hence the community was named Crabb or Crabb Switch. In 1894 the settlement was served by a post office. By 1896 there were 400 people living in the community, which had a cotton gin, a school, two doctors, two orchards, and a Methodist church. A separate school for black children opened the following year. The post office was closed in 1900. The population shrank in size until it fell to 100 in 1933. Three years later there were two churches, one business, and a few houses in Crabb. The number of inhabitants shrank to 50 in 1953 and to 40 from the 1960s to the 1980s. In the late 1980s the population increased to 125 and remained steady through 2000.

The town was made notable when an 11-year-old named Brian Zimmerman won an unofficial election for mayor in 1983. He worked to incorporate the small town, which had a population of under 200 when he was elected. This threatened his mayorship because of Texas state law prohibiting minors from serving as mayor. His story was made into a movie called Lone Star Kid. While his bid lost, he was reelected mayor again after the referendum.

Government and infrastructure
Fort Bend County does not have a hospital district. OakBend Medical Center serves as the county's charity hospital which the county contracts with.

Education
Crabb is zoned to schools in the Lamar Consolidated Independent School District.

Zoned schools include:
 Williams Elementary School (North of FM 762)
 Polly Ryon Middle School
 Antoinette Reading Junior High
 George Ranch High School

 Former zoning
 Navarro Middle School
 B.F. Terry High School

Gallery

Notes

References

Unincorporated communities in Texas
Unincorporated communities in Fort Bend County, Texas
Greater Houston